Dogok-dong is an affluent ward of Gangnam-gu in Seoul, South Korea. It is home to high-end residential homes including the Samsung Tower Palace, a luxury residential complex which contains the eleventh-tallest building in South Korea.

Education
Schools located in Dogok-dong:
 Eonju Elementary School
 Seoul Daedo Elementary School
 Daechi Middle School
 Dogok Middle School
 Eunseong Middle School
 Sookmyung Girls' Middle School
 Eunkwang Girls' High School
 Sookmyung Girls' High School
 Chungang University High School

Transportation
Dogok-dong is served by Dogok Station and Hanti Station on the  Line. It is also served by Maebong Station, Dogok Station and Yangjae Station on the Line 3 of the Seoul Subway.

See also 
Yangjaecheon
Samsung Tower Palace
Dong of Gangnam-gu

References

External links
 Dogok 1-dong resident office site
Gangnam-gu site 

Neighbourhoods in Gangnam District